Anadi Sankar Gupta (1 November 1932, Barisal – 14 June 2012, Kolkata) was an Indian mathematician. Till his death, he was an INSA Senior Scientist and emeritus faculty with the Department of Mathematics, IIT Kharagpur.

He was awarded the Shanti Swarup Bhatnagar Prize for mathematical sciences in 1972 by the Government of India for his "significant contributions in the field of fluid dynamics and magnetohydrodynamics, notably on heat transfer in free convection flow in the presence of magnetic field," amongst other things.

Life
Anadi Sankar Gupta was born to Pramode Chandra and Usharani Gupta in Goila of Barisal district in the then British India (present Bangladesh). He had his initial schooling at Domohani Kelejora High School in Asansol, West Bengal. Gupta completed his bachelors from Presidency College, Calcutta in 1952 and followed it up with a master's in applied mathematics from the University of Calcutta in 1954.

Prof. Gupta died in Kolkata on 14 June 2012 after suddenly taking ill.

Academic career
Gupta's doctoral thesis was done under the supervision of G. Bandyopadhyay at the Indian Institute of Technology Kharagpur in 1958. He further acquired a D. Sc. from the same institute in 1966.

He joined the faculty of IIT Kharagpur in 1957 as an associate lecturer and rose through the ranks to become a professor and subsequently, an emeritus. He was President of the annual Congress of the Indian Mathematical Society in 1999. He also served on the editorial boards of various scientific journals. He retired in 1993, but continued to be active in research.

Research areas
 Boundary layer theory
 Heat and mass transfer in fluid flows
 Hydrodynamic stability
 Stability of flows

Selected publications

Books

Awards and honours
 Fellow of The National Academy of Sciences, India (1990).
 Fellow, Indian National Science Academy (1980).
 FICCI Award, 1978.
 Shanti Swarup Bhatnagar Prize for Science and Technology, 1972.

References

1932 births
20th-century Indian mathematicians
Fellows of the Indian National Science Academy
Fellows of The National Academy of Sciences, India
IIT Kharagpur alumni
Academic staff of IIT Kharagpur
University of Calcutta alumni
People from Asansol
2012 deaths
21st-century Indian mathematicians
Presidents of the Indian Mathematical Society
Recipients of the Shanti Swarup Bhatnagar Award in Mathematical Science
Scientists from Kolkata